Not Tight (stylized as NOT TiGHT) is the debut studio album by Domi and JD Beck. It was released on July 29, 2022, through Apeshit Inc. and Blue Note Records. It was nominated for Best Contemporary Instrumental Album at the 65th Grammy Awards.

Release 

Domi and JD Beck announced the release of Not Tight in June 2022 shortly after signing to Anderson .Paak's label Apeshit Inc. The album's release was preceded by four singles, including "Take a Chance", which featured Paak and was accompanied by a music video directed by Paak.

In August 2022, Domi and JD Beck performed a Tiny Desk Concert for NPR, featuring four tracks from the album. It was their first time performing the song "U Don't Have to Rob Me" in front of a live audience, which features both artists on vocals.

Critical reception 

Not Tight was met with critical acclaim. At Metacritic, the album received an aggregate score of 82 based on 5 reviews, indicating "universal acclaim."

Writing for Pitchfork, writer Kieran Press-Reynolds praised Domi and JD Beck's technical virtuosity, calling the album "a smooth but frenetic set aimed at bringing jazz fusion to a new hyper-brained generation." In a positive review for PopMatters, contributor Brandon Miller complimented the duo's "jaw-dropping" musicianship and chemistry, noting the album's "incredible time feel, unconventional beats, not to mention neo-soul and gospel-stretching harmonies." Other critics praised the album's "youthful charm," "stacked lineup" of featured artists, and rapid-fire breakbeats and chord changes over complex time signatures.

NPR's Bobby Carter called the album "ironically titled."

Track listing 

Notes
 Every song title is stylized in all capital letters, except every letter "i" is lowercase.

Charts

References 

2022 albums
Blue Note Records albums